KWYN (1400 AM) is a radio station licensed to Wynne, Arkansas.  The station broadcasts a Classic Country format and is owned by East Arkansas Broadcasters, Inc. They offer traditional country music, live local sports programming, network news, and agricultural market reports.

History 
Since its launch on September 28, 1956, KWYN-AM 1400 has increased from 250 watts to 1,000 watts full-time. Raymond O. "Bud" and Hannah Raley, who were born and raised in Paragould, Arkansas, founded KWYN.

With its Yawn Patrol program, KWYN also boasts the longest-running discussion show in the Mid-South and has consistently ranked among the top AM stations in the country.

The office and studios of KWYN are located in Wynne, Arkansas.

References

External links
KWYN's official website

WYN
Classic country radio stations in the United States